James or Jim Gardner may refer to:

 James Gardner (surveyor), British engineer
 James Gardner (designer) (1907–1995), British industrial designer
 James Gardner (musician) (born 1962), British musician and composer
 James A. Gardner (1943–1966), Vietnam War Medal of Honor recipient
 James Alan Gardner (born 1955), Canadian science fiction author
 James Alexander Gardner (born 1970), British innovation author and technologist
 James Cardwell Gardner (1864–1935), English doctor and amateur rower
 Jim Gardner (politician) (born 1933), Lieutenant Governor of North Carolina
 James Daniel Gardner (1839–1905), American Civil War Medal of Honor recipient
 James Knoll Gardner (1940–2017), U.S. federal judge
 James N. Gardner (born 1946), complexity theorist and science essayist
 James Patrick Gardner (1883–1937), Member of Parliament for Hammersmith North
 Jim Gardner (baseball) (1874–1905), baseball pitcher
 Jim Gardner (broadcaster) (born 1948), stage name of James Goldman, American news anchor for WPVI-TV in Philadelphia, Pennsylvania
 Jim Gardner (Commander in Chief character), fictional White House Chief of Staff on the television series Commander in Chief
 Jim Gardner (trade unionist) (1893–1976), Scottish trade unionist
 James Terry Gardiner (1842–1912), American surveyor and engineer, used the Gardner spelling for part of his life

See also
 James Gardiner (disambiguation)
 James Garner (disambiguation)
 Jimmy Gardner (disambiguation)